

Key

Key to national competitions:
 Liga I, Divizia A = 1st Romanian League
 Liga II, Divizia B = 2nd Romanian League
 City Championship = City league (temporary, post-war)
 District Championship I = 1st District League
 District Championship II = 2nd District League 

Key to league:
 Pos. = Final position
 Pl. = Played
 W = Games won
 D = Games drawn
 L = Games lost
 GF = Goals scored
 GA = Goals against
 Pts = Points

Key to rounds:
 C = Champion
 F = Final (Runner-up)
 SF = Semi-finals
 QF = Quarter-finals
 R16/R32 = Round of 16, round of 32, etc.
 3R = Third round
 GS = Group stage

Seasons

Pre-war era
Romania did not have a national football league until the 1932–1933 season. It was organized in District Championships and the winners of the District Championships I took part in a national play-off to determine the champion. During this time, Politehnica only played at the district level and the second and third leagues, when they latter two were intermittently organized before the war.

Post-war era
With an establish national football league, Politehnica were selected to start in the second tier (Divizia B at the time). Since then, the club has never played in a lower league, in spite of being officially relegated twice, in 2000 and 2002 – first saved after a place swap with Dacia Pitesti and then as AEK Bucuresti was moved to Timișoara and renamed Politehnica AEK. After the club went bankrupt and was dissolved in 2012, another second league club, AC Recaș, was moved to Timișoara to offer continuity to Politehnica, resulting in ACS Poli Timișoara. At the same time, the supporters decided to create a phoenix club, under the name of ASU Politehnica Timișoara. However, ACS Poli is credited as the official record holder and legal successor of the original club founded in 1921, FC Politehnica Timișoara.  It is co-owned by the City Council and the County Council and has the backing of the Politehnica University of Timișoara, all three being active members in the legal entity running the club. Poli Timișoara is a Romanian football club established in 1921.

Notes

References

ACS Poli Timișoara